Elections to the Mizoram Legislative Assembly were held in February 1987 to elect members of the 40 constituencies in Mizoram, India. Although designated as Independents, the Mizo National Front won the majority of seats. Its leader, Laldenga was appointed as the Chief Minister of Mizoram.

One of the conditions of the Mizoram Peace Accord was the conversion of Mizoram from a Union Territory to a state. This was achieved through the State of Mizoram Act, 1986 by which, the seats in the Legislative Assembly were increased from thirty to forty.

Result

Elected Members

See also 
 List of constituencies of the Mizoram Legislative Assembly

References

Mizoram
1987
1987